Gideon Buthelezi (born 16 July 1986) is a South African professional boxer. He held the IBO super-flyweight title since 2015, and previously the IBO minimumweight and light-flyweight titles between 2010 and 2011.

Personal
Buthelezi was born Bongani Gideon and resides in Boipatong, Gauteng.He has 3 children.
Buthelezi is the second born of the late Nomvula Buthelezi. He has two siblings, Kgalalelo Tshetlo and Stella Malwazi Buthelezi

Professional career

Buthelezi vs. Liriano 
On 29 April 2016, Buthelezi fought and defeated Diego Liriano via unanimous decision, winning on each of the three scorecards, 120–108, 119–109 and 108–111.

Buthelezi vs. Leone 
On 27 July 2018, Buthelezi fought Lucas Leone. Buthelezi won the fight via unanimous decision.

Professional boxing record

References

External links

Gideon Buthelezi – Profile, News Archive & Current Rankings at Box.Live

1986 births
Living people
People from Boipatong
Zulu people
Mini-flyweight boxers
South African male boxers
Sportspeople from Gauteng